Electric Cinema may refer to:

The Electric, Birmingham, the oldest running cinema in the United Kingdom
The Electric Cinema, Notting Hill, a cinema in Notting Hill, London
Electric Cinema, York, a former cinema in York, in England